Charles J. Stewart may refer to:
 Charles Stewart (actor), American film and television actor
 Charles J. Stewart (business), chairman of Manufacturers Hanover Trust Company

See also
 Charles Stewart (disambiguation)